Israel first participated at the Youth Olympic Games at the inaugural 2010 Games. Israel has sent a team to each Summer Youth Olympic Games and to Winter Youth Olympic Games since 2016.

Medal tables

Medals by Summer Games

Medals by Winter Games

Medals by summer sport

Medals by winter sport

List of medalists

Flag bearers

Youth Olympic participants

Summer Youth Olympics

Winter Youth Olympics

References

 
Nations at the Youth Olympic Games